Andrew Janiak is a professor of philosophy at Duke University, where he directs the Graduate Program in History and Philosophy of Science. He received an M.A. from the University of Michigan and a Ph.D from Indiana University.  His dissertation was directed by Michael Friedman. . He received the Richard K. Lublin Distinguished Award for Teaching Excellence in 2009.
Janiak writes on the philosophy of science, philosophy of physics, and the history of modern philosophy, especially on the philosophical works of Isaac Newton.

Janiak served as dissertation advisor for Matthew C. Harris, who was taken into custody after making threats against his former employer, UCLA.

References

External links 
 Janiak's Duke page

Living people
21st-century American philosophers
Duke University faculty
Year of birth missing (living people)
University of Michigan alumni
Indiana University alumni